Mesu Kunavula (born 31 October 1995)  is a Fijian international rugby union player. He plays for Brive in the Top 14.

Kunavula made his debut for the Fiji Rugby 7s team at the 2016 Dubai Rugby Sevens Tournament and is a silver medalist at the 2018 Commonwealth Games.

In 2019 he signed a contract with Edinburgh. In January 2022 he extended his contract with Edinborough.

References 

Living people
1995 births
Place of birth missing (living people)
Fiji international rugby sevens players
Fijian rugby union players
Rugby union flankers
Edinburgh Rugby players
Fiji international rugby union players
Commonwealth Games medallists in rugby sevens
Commonwealth Games silver medallists for Fiji
Rugby sevens players at the 2018 Commonwealth Games
CA Brive players
Medallists at the 2018 Commonwealth Games